The 2008 Ukrainian Cup Final was a football match that took place at the Metalist Stadium on May 7, 2008. The match was the 17th Ukrainian Cup Final and it was contested by Shakhtar Donetsk and Dynamo Kyiv. The 2008 Ukrainian Cup FInal was the first to be held outside of the Ukrainian capital Kyiv. Shakhtar won the match 2–0 through goals from Oleksandr Gladkiy and Oleksiy Gai.

The match had five red cards issued, two to Dynamo players and three to Shakhtar players. The match also had six yellow cards (Gladkiy received two), four of which were given to Shakhtar players and two to Dynamo players. This was in part because of players' violent behavior and also because referee Victor Shvetsov made several misjudgments.

Road to Kharkiv 

All 16 Ukrainian Premier League clubs do not have to go through qualification to get into the competition; Dynamo and Shakhtar therefore both qualified for the competition automatically.

Dynamo had a lot of instability en route to the final. At the beginning of the season, manager Anatoliy Demyanenko resigned after рoor results to start the season. He was replaced by former Dynamo player and coach Yozhef Sabo, who later resigned from his post afterwards due to personal health problems. In November 2007, Dynamo appointed assistant coach Oleh Luzhnyi as interim coach, who was in charge until 8 December and managed to get Dynamo through the quarter-finals. Finally, in December 2008, the club appointed former Russia national team manager Yuriy Semin.

Match details

Match statistics

See also
 2007–08 Ukrainian Cup

References

External links 
 Calendar of Matches – Schedule of the 2007–08 Ukrainian Cup on Professional Football League of Ukraine Website. 

Cup Final
Ukrainian Cup finals
Ukrainian Cup Final 2008
Ukrainian Cup Final 2008
Sport in Kharkiv
May 2008 sports events in Ukraine
2000s in Kharkiv